National Transmission & Despatch Company (NTDC) is a Pakistani autonomous power transmission company under ministry of Energy (Power Division).

History
National Transmission & Despatch Company was separated from Water & Power Development Authority (WAPDA) in 1998 and owns all 220 KV and 500KV grid stations and transmission lines in Pakistan. Its present headquarters are located at WAPDA House, Lahore, Pakistan.

The company operates fourteen 500 KV and forty-three 220 KV grid stations, 5893 km of 500 KV transmission lines, and 10963 km of 220 KV transmission lines in Pakistan.

In 1985, National Power Control Center (NPCC) was established in 1985 in Islamabad to control 500kV and 220kV transmission system throughout the country which includes eight Regional Control Centers (RCC).

References

Electric power transmission system operators in Pakistan
Companies based in Lahore
Government-owned companies of Pakistan
Energy companies established in 1998
Pakistani companies established in 1998